Daniel Lucas may refer to:

 Daniel Anthony Lucas (1978–2016), American convicted murderer
 Daniel B. Lucas (18361909), American poet and lawyer
 Daniel Lucas, editor of Chess Life
 Daniel Lucas (Vanished character), character on the television show Vanished
 Dani Segovia (born 1985), Spanish professional footballer
 Danny Lucas (born 1958), Canadian ice hockey right winger